Thawar Chand Gehlot (born 18 May 1948) is an Indian politician who is the current and 13th Governor of Karnataka, being the first person serving as the Governor of Karnataka from Madhya Pradesh. He assumed office of the Governor of Karnataka on July 11, 2021. He also served as the Minister of Social Justice and Empowerment from 2014 to 2021. He was also the Leader of the House in the upper house of Indian Parliament. He was a member of the Parliamentary Board and the Central Election Committee of the BJP.

Early life 
Gehlot was born in a Dalit family in the village of Rupeta in Nagda in the Central India Agency of the Dominion of India, which is in present-day Madhya Pradesh, India. He is a senior member of Bharatiya Janata Party. He had assumed ministerial berth a number of times in the union government.

He completed his Bachelor of Arts degree from Vikram University, Ujjain, Madhya Pradesh.

Career 
He was a member of the Rajya Sabha, upper house of Indian Parliament representing the state of Madhya Pradesh. He was awarded an honorary doctorate by the Dr. B.R. Ambedkar University of Social Sciences. He formerly represented Shajapur in the lower house of Indian Parliament, Lok Sabha from 1996 to 2009. He served as the Union Minister for Social Justice and Empowerement, in Modi's 2nd cabinet. He is a member of the Bharatiya Janata Party (BJP) and was also the general secretary of the party.

Further on July 6, 2021, Thawar Chand Gehlot was appointed as the 19th Governor of Karnataka.

References

External links
 Members of Rajya Sabha from Madhya Pradesh – Parliament of India website
 Biographical Sketch of Member of 13th Lok Sabha
 Business News Today: Read Latest Business news, India Business News Live, Share Market & Economy News
 Official biographical sketch in Parliament of India website

|-

|-

|-

1949 births
Living people
Bharatiya Janata Party politicians from Madhya Pradesh
Governors of Karnataka
Vikram University alumni
Leaders of the Rajya Sabha
Rajya Sabha members from Madhya Pradesh
Lok Sabha members from Madhya Pradesh
Members of the Cabinet of India
India MPs 1996–1997
Politicians from Ujjain
Narendra Modi ministry
India MPs 1998–1999
India MPs 1999–2004
India MPs 2004–2009
Rajya Sabha members from the Bharatiya Janata Party
Bharatiya Janata Party politicians from Karnataka